Htanthi Mont is a popular traditional Burmese snack, made from toddy palm, coconut milk, baking soda, sugar and rice flour.

References 

Burmese cuisine
Foods containing coconut